The Reeves AN/MSQ-1 Close Support Control Set produced by Reeves Instrument Corporation was a trailer-mounted combination radar/computer/communication ("Q" system) developed under a Rome Air Development Center program office (MPS-9 radar & OA-215) for Cold War command guidance of manned aircraft (e.g., those equipped with AN/APS-11A or AN/APW-11 avionics.)  Developed for Korean War ground-directed bombing (e.g., B-26 bombers), one detachment of the 3903rd Radar Bomb Scoring Squadron bombed itself with an MSQ-1 because it mistakenly used procedures for the earlier SCR-584/OA-294 system (the MSQ-1 was later replaced by the Reeves AN/MSQ-2 Close Support Control Set.)  The MSQ-1 was subsequently used for nuclear testing during Operation Argus (mounted on the ) and during Operation Teapot, and for aircraft tests such as for "MSQ-1 controlled pinpoint photography" in 1954 (RB-57A Canberra "Night Photo Bombing").

The set had a direct current analog computer and was modified to use an alternating current computer for Matador Automatic Radar Control (AN/MSQ-1A) to guide MGM-1 Matadors and other unmanned aerial vehicles.  The MSQ-1 was considered for guidance of the "XQ-5 Target" drone in 1957,

Radar stations
In addition to the Tadpole radar stations of the Korean War, a downrange AN/MSQ-1 for the Atlantic Missile Range had been at Florida's Jupiter Missile Guidance Annex in 1952, and an MSQ-1 radar station on the United States Gulf Coast for the RB-57A tests.

References

1951 in military history
Aerial warfare ground equipment
Cold War military computer systems of the United States
Ground radars
Military equipment introduced in the 1950s